Coleophora cythisanthi is a moth of the family Coleophoridae. It is found in Italy and Slovenia.

The larvae feed on Cytisanthus radiatus. They feed on the lateral shoots of their host plant.

References

cythisanthi
Moths described in 1978
Moths of Europe